Cordeiro is a Portuguese language surname. The equivalent in Spanish is Cordero. Notable people with the surname include:

Acácio Cordeiro Barreto, Brazilian international footballer
André Cordeiro (water polo) (born 1967), Brazilian water polo goalkeeper
André Cordeiro (swimmer) (born 1974), Brazilian freestyle swimmer
António Cordeiro (1641–1722), Portuguese Catholic priest, Azorean historian, author of the classical chronicle Historia Insulana
Cristiano Cordeiro, Brazil born Hong Kong international footballer
Domingas Cordeiro (born 1976), Angolan handball player
Douglas Cordeiro (born 1979), Brazilian male volleyball player
Duarte Cordeiro (born 1979), Portuguese economist and politician
Edson Cordeiro (born 1967), sopranist countertenor and pop and jazz singer
Flávio Elias Cordeiro (born 1975), Brazilian football player
Gauss Moutinho Cordeiro (born 1952), Brazilian engineer, mathematician and statistician
Jorge Cordeiro, (born 1978), professional football coach and former player
Joseph Cordeiro (1918–1994), the first Pakistani cardinal
Leonardo Cordeiro (born 1989), Brazilian racing driver
Lorna Cordeiro, Konkani language singer from the state of Goa, India
Lucas Cordeiro (born 1991), Brazilian professional footballer
Luciano Cordeiro (1844–1900), Portuguese writer, historian, politician and geographer
Manuel Cordeiro (born 1983), Portuguese football manager since 2005
Marcelo Cordeiro (born 1981), Brazilian footballer
Margarida Cordeiro (born 1939), Portuguese psychologist and film director from Mogadouro
Mauricio Plenckauskas Cordeiro, Brazilian footballer
Moacyr Cordeiro (1921–1989), Brazilian footballer
Pedro Cordeiro (born 1963), former professional tennis player from Portugal
Pico do Brejo do Cordeiro, peak on the island of São Jorge in the Azores
"Uncle Ray" — Ray Cordeiro (1924–2023), Hong Kong media personality
Rodrigo Crasso Cordeiro (born 1987), Brazilian footballer
Rui Cordeiro (born 1976), Portuguese rugby union footballer
Ryan Cordeiro (born 1986), American former professional soccer player
Sandro Raniere Guimarães Cordeiro (born 1989), Brazilian footballer
Saulo Batista de Andrade Cordeiro (born 1979), retired Brazilian footballer
Vasco Cordeiro (born 1973), President of the Regional Government of the Azores
Vera Cordeiro (born 1950), social entrepreneur and physician

Fiction:
Fran Cordeiro, central character in the novel The Meadows of the Moon by James Hilton

Other
Cordeiro, Rio de Janeiro
Pico do Brejo do Cordeiro, peak on the island of São Jorge in the Azores
Corceiro, similarly spelled surname

Portuguese-language surnames